A list of the films produced in the Cinema of Mexico ordered by year of release in the 1940s. For an alphabetical list of articles on Mexican films see :Category:Mexican films.

1940
 List of Mexican films of 1940

1941
 List of Mexican films of 1941

1942
 List of Mexican films of 1942

1943
 List of Mexican films of 1943

1944
 List of Mexican films of 1944

1945
 List of Mexican films of 1945

1946
 List of Mexican films of 1946

1947
 List of Mexican films of 1947

1948
 List of Mexican films of 1948

1949
 List of Mexican films of 1949

External links
 Mexican film at the Internet Movie Database

Mexican
Films

fr:Liste de films mexicains
zh:墨西哥電影列表